Ndaroini is a settlement in Kenya's Central Province.

References 

Ndaroini is a small shopping center in a hill, other important places near ndaroini is Ndaroini coffee factory, Gatundu primary and secondary schools

Populated places in Central Province (Kenya)